The Ambassador  League is a high school athletic league that is part of the CIF Southern Section. Members are independent Christian schools located in Riverside County and San Bernardino County.

Members
As of the 2019–2020 season:
 Aquinas High School
 Arrowhead Christian Academy
Desert Christian Academy
 Linfield Christian School
 Woodcrest Christian High School
 Ontario Christian High School
 Western Christian High School

References

CIF Southern Section leagues